{{Album ratings
| rev1 = AllMusic
| rev1Score = 
| rev2 = The A.V. Club
| rev2Score = B−
| rev3 = BBC Music
| rev3Score = mixed
| rev4 = Clash
| rev4Score = 8/10
| rev5 = Entertainment Weekly
| rev5Score = B
| rev6 = The Guardian
| rev6score = 
| rev7 = MusicOMH
| rev7Score = 
| rev8 = NME
| rev8Score = 8/10
| rev9 = Rolling Stone
| rev9Score = 
| rev10 = Slant Magazine
| rev10score = <ref name="Cataldo">Cataldo, Jesse Tinie Tempah: Disc-Overy | Music Review]. Slant Magazine. Retrieved on 16 May 2011.</ref>
}}Disc-Overy is the debut studio album by the British rapper Tinie Tempah, released in Ireland on 1 October 2010 and in the United Kingdom on 4 October, by Parlophone Records. The original album track list includes Kelly Rowland, Ellie Goulding, Labrinth, Emeli Sandé, Eric Turner, Wiz Khalifa, Swedish House Mafia and Range. Disc-Overy uses predominantly upbeat, dance-orientated production with lyrics concerning fame, youth and love. The album earned Tinie two Brit Awards in 2011 and has received Double-Platinum certification by the BPI. It also reached number one on the UK Albums Chart. In July 2011, Disc-Overy was announced as a nominee for the annual Mercury Music Prize.

Following the success of "Written in the Stars" as the album's North American lead single, it was announced that Disc-Overy would receive a United States release with a revised track list. The tracks "Obsession", "Invincible" featuring Kelly Rowland, and "Just A Little" featuring the Roc Nation artist Range were removed from the American track list, while new collaborations with Wiz Khalifa, Bei Maejor and Ester Dean were added. New production contributions came from Boi-1da, Alex da Kid and Stargate. The album was released in the United States on 17 May 2011. The three new tracks were later released in the United Kingdom on a deluxe edition of Disc-Overy, made available on 20 June 2011.

Background
Discussing Disc-Overy, Tinie Tempah said, "If you've heard "Pass Out" and "Frisky" and think you know what to expect, you're wrong. I wanted this album to be really raw, not only in terms of the production but the guests. I was only interested in working with people I really respect and who I'm a fan of." He also said, "I met Ellie Goulding very early on, we swapped numbers and after that we started living very parallel worlds; the same festivals, interviews and so on. It made total sense to have her on the album."

 Chart performance 
On its release, Disc-Overy received generally positive reviews, earning praise for its broad musical appeal and being compared with other crossover acts such as Dizzee Rascal and Tinchy Stryder. Following an anticipated release as a result of several setbacks from its original winter 2009 release date, Disc-Overy entered number the UK Album Chart at number one, selling 85,000 copies in its first week. Six singles from the album have attained UK chart success, including the number ones "Pass Out" and "Written in the Stars". Disc-Overy has received double platinum certification by British Phonographic Industry (BPI) and has sold over 750,000 copies in the UK alone since its release. It has spent fifty consecutive weeks in the UK Top 40 Albums Chart to date. In the US, the album debuted at number twenty-one on the Billboard 200 with 16,400 copies sold in the first week.
In the second week, 6,300 copies were sold, making a total of 22,700 domestic units in two weeks.

Singles
"Pass Out" was released as the album's first single on 28 February 2010. Produced by Labrinth, who also sang the vocal hook, the track entered the UK Singles Chart at number one, selling 92,000 copies in it first week. The track was later released on vinyl to promote the third annual Record Store Day, and a remix was recorded with Snoop Dogg for the American market, although it was later decided that the original version would be marketed in there. "Frisky" was released as the album's second single on 4 June 2010. The track features production and guest vocals by Labrinth. After a highly publicised chart battle with Dizzee Rascal and James Corden's official World Cup single "Shout", "Frisky" debuted and peaked at number two on the UK Singles Chart.

"Written in the Stars" was released as the album's third single on 27 September 2010. The track features guest vocals from the American singer and multi-instrumentalist Eric Turner, and was produced by iSHi. After first-week sales of over 115,000 copies, "Written in the Stars" entered the UK Singles Chart at number one, becoming Tinie Tempah's second number one on the chart and his third consecutive top three hit. The track was later released as Tempah's first single in the United States, reaching number twelve on the Billboard Hot 100. "Invincible" was released as the album's fourth official single on 26 December 2010. The track features guest vocals from the American singer Kelly Rowland. The track peaked at #11 on the UK Singles Chart after nine weeks in the Top 40.

"Wonderman" was released as the album's fifth official single on 7 March 2011. The track features guest vocals from the British singer-songwriter Ellie Goulding. The track peaked at number twelve on the UK Singles Chart, becoming Tempah's lowest charting single to date, one place behind its predecessor, "Invincible". "Till I'm Gone" was released as the first single from the deluxe edition of the album on 17 May 2011. It was also released as Tempah's second single in the United States. The track features guest vocals from the American rapper Wiz Khalifa. Despite not being released in the United Kingdom until August 2011, the track peaked at #24 on the UK Singles Chart.

 Other notable charting songs 
"Miami 2 Ibiza", was released as a single on 4 October 2010. The track is a collaboration between Tempah and the Swedish House Mafia, from the latter's album Until One (2010). The track peaked at #4 on the UK Singles Chart. "Simply Unstoppable" was released as a promotional single from the album on 20 April 2011, albeit in remixed form, in order to promote a Lucozade advertising campaign. The track peaked at #33 on the UK Singles Chart. The remix of the track features the drummer Travis Barker and the boxer Katie Taylor. "Love Suicide" also received some coverage in selected European countries, charting in Ireland at number 7, and in the Netherlands at number 20. The track features guest vocals from Ester Dean.

 Critical reception 
On its release, Disc-Overy received generally positive reviews from music critics. At Metacritic, which assigns a normalized rating out of 100 to reviews from mainstream critics, the album received an average score of 72, based on 18 reviews, which indicates "generally favorable reviews".

Track listing

Notes
 Track listing and credits from album booklet.
  signifies a co-producer
  signifies an additional producer
  signifies a remixer
"Intro" features uncredited vocals from Vanya Taylor.
"Simply Unstoppable" features uncredited vocals from Vanya Taylor
"Pass Out" features uncredited vocals from Labrinth
"Illusion" features uncredited vocals from Sam Frank
"Snap" features uncredited vocals from Mark Asari

Charts and certifications

Weekly charts

Year-end charts

Decade-end charts

Certifications

Release history

See also
List of UK Albums Chart number ones of the 2010s
List of number-one albums from the 2010s (Scotland)

References

External links
 [https://www.metacritic.com/music/disc-overy/critic-reviews Disc-Overy'' at Metacritic

2010 debut albums
Albums produced by Boi-1da
Albums produced by Emile Haynie
Albums produced by Alex da Kid
Albums produced by No I.D.
Tinie Tempah albums
Albums produced by Naughty Boy
Albums produced by Stargate
Albums produced by Labrinth
Albums produced by Al Shux